Maxim Viktorovich Marinin (born 23 March 1977) is a Russian former competitive pair skater. With partner Tatiana Totmianina, he is the 2006 Olympic champion, two-time World champion, and five-time European champion.

Career 
Marinin was born in Volgograd, Russia, and began skating at age four after his parents saw an advertisement for a skating school. After losing to the much younger Evgeni Plushenko, Marinin realized he would not be competitive in singles skating. Due to Marinin's height, a coach asked him to switch to pairs and move to Saint Petersburg. Marinin began skating pairs in 1993. He met Tatiana Totmianina in 1995 at the Russian Nationals which he attended without a partner. They began skating together in 1996. Early in their career together, they were coached by Natalia Pavlova in Saint Petersburg, with choreography by Svetlana Korol.

Totmianina/Marinin made consistent progress on the world scene through the late 1990s. In 1998, the pair asked Tamara Moskvina to coach them but she was unable to take on more students and suggested 1984 Olympic pairs champion Oleg Vasiliev. He declined due to lack of ice and connections but he accepted in 2001 when Moskvina again directed them to him. Totmianina/Marinin left Pavlova just prior to the 2001 European Championships and moved to Chicago in the United States to train under Vasiliev. They trained at the Oakton Ice Arena in Park Ridge, Illinois.

Totmianina/Marinin won their first major title at the 2002 European Championships, and went on to finish 4th at the 2002 Winter Olympics in Salt Lake City. Twice in a row, they finished second at the World Championships to their Chinese rivals Shen Xue / Zhao Hongbo, before finally winning gold in 2004. The day after winning their first World title, Totmianina suffered a dislocated shoulder in practice. They were unable to perform in the exhibition.

Accident 
On 23 October 2004, during the free skate at the 2004 Skate America in Pittsburgh, Marinin lost his balance while attempting an axel lasso lift and Totmianina slammed to the ice head first. She sustained a concussion and spent the night in a local hospital. On 25 October, Totmianina said that, although she felt pain, she had no memory of the accident and was not afraid to return to the ice. She recovered from her injuries rapidly and was able to return to the ice within days. Although Totmianina did not blame him, the accident weighed heavily on Marinin and when the pair returned to training, he was unable to lift her due to panic. He began seeing a sport psychologist who helped him overcome it.

Continued career 

Totmianina/Marinin returned to competition two months later in January 2005, winning gold at the Russian Nationals and then the European Championships. In March, they competed at the World Championships, held in Moscow, Russia. They won their second consecutive World title easily, with a total score 10 points higher than the second-place finishers.

Totmianina/Marinin dominated world competition from that point onward. In December 2005, Totmianina was hospitalized with a gall bladder problem. They won their fifth consecutive European Championship the following month in January 2006. With Shen/Zhao recovering from an Achilles tendon injury, Totmianina/Marinin were the clear favorites for Olympic gold in Turin, Italy. They won the short program on 11 February and then the long program on 13 February, capturing the 2006 Olympic pair skating title.

Totmianina/Marinin did not compete at the World Championships in March 2006. They later announced their retirement from competition. The pair toured with the Champions on Ice show, with other notable skaters including Michelle Kwan, Evgeni Plushenko, and Viktor Petrenko, among others. They also performed regularly in Ilia Averbukh's ice shows in Russia, including Ice Symphony and Professionals' Cup. 

Marinin choreographed Vera Bazarova / Andrei Deputat's 2014–15 short program.

Personal life 
Marinin was born on 23 March 1977 in Volgograd. He and Natalia Somova, a ballerina at the Stanislavski Moscow Theatre, have two children. Their son, Artem, was born on 29 September 2007 in Krasnodar, Russia, and their daughter, Juliana, was born on 19 October 2012. The family lives in Moscow.

Programs 

(with Totmianina)

Results 
(with Totmianina)

References

External links 

 

1977 births
Living people
Russian male pair skaters
Olympic figure skaters of Russia
Figure skaters at the 2002 Winter Olympics
Figure skaters at the 2006 Winter Olympics
Olympic gold medalists for Russia
Sportspeople from Volgograd
Olympic medalists in figure skating
World Figure Skating Championships medalists
European Figure Skating Championships medalists
Medalists at the 2006 Winter Olympics